Ivan "Ivica" Vdović (14 March 1961 – 25 September 1992), also known as Vd, was a Serbian musician, drummer of Yugoslav rock bands such as Suncokret, Šarlo Akrobata and Katarina II.

In his junior year of high school, Vdović became a member of the band Limunovo drvo led by Milan Mladenović. He later played drums in Bora Đorđević's band Suncokret but became famous as the drummer of Šarlo Akrobata whose other two members were Mladenović and Dušan Kojić. He stayed with Šarlo Akrobata from April 1980 to October 1981, and then joined Mladenović to form Katarina II together with Bojan Pečar, Gagi Mihajlović and Margita Stefanović. After Mihajlović left the band, the name was changed to Ekatarina Velika but Vdović soon left the band in 1985.

The same year, Vdović was tested HIV positive. He was the first person in Yugoslavia to be officially registered as HIV positive. He died of AIDS on 25 September 1992 and is buried in Belgrade.

References

External links

1961 births
1992 deaths
Musicians from Belgrade
Yugoslav musicians
Serbian rock drummers
Serbian punk rock musicians
Post-punk musicians
AIDS-related deaths in Serbia
20th-century drummers